The 2012 UAB Blazers football team represented the University of Alabama at Birmingham (UAB) in the 2012 NCAA Division I FBS football season as a member of the East Division of Conference USA (C-USA). They were led by first year head coach Garrick McGee and played their home games at Legion Field in Birmingham, Alabama. The 2012 squad finished the season with a record of three wins and nine losses (3–9 overall, 2–6 in the C-USA).

Schedule

Game summaries

Troy

@ South Carolina

@ Ohio State

Tulsa

Southeastern Louisiana

@ Houston

East Carolina

@ Tulane

@ Southern Miss

Marshall

Memphis

@ UCF

References

UAB
UAB Blazers football seasons
UAB Blazers football